The James Coleman House was built in Swainsboro, Georgia during 1900–1904. It was listed on the National Register of Historic Places in 1992. In 2017, it was a bed and breakfast inn, the Coleman House Inn.

It is a two-story wood-frame Queen Anne-style house with Classical Revival-style details.

It has 11 fireplaces.

On the south side of the property is a contributing one-story, brick hot house, used as a tool shed. There is also a non-contributing four-car garage.

References

External links
Coleman House Inn, official website

Houses on the National Register of Historic Places in Georgia (U.S. state)
Queen Anne architecture in Georgia (U.S. state)
Houses completed in 1904
Houses in Emanuel County, Georgia
National Register of Historic Places in Emanuel County, Georgia